François de Neufville, Duke of Villeroy (7 April 164418 July 1730) was a French nobleman and military officer.

Biography
Villeroy was born in Lyon into noble family which had risen into prominence in the reign of Charles IX. His father Nicolas V de Neufville, Marquis of Villeroy, Marshal of France (1598–1685) was governor of the young King Louis XIV who later made him a duke.

François was brought up in close relations with Louis XIV and became a member of his inner circle. As a young child, he played with the King and his younger brother the Prince Philippe in the Palais Royal (home of Louis XIV and his mother Anne d'Autriche) and the nearby Hôtel de Villeroy (the home of the young François de Villeroy and his father the governor Nicolas V de Villeroy, the historic Hôtel de Villeroy is a 500 m walk from the Palais-Royal on 34 rue des Bourdonnais or 9 rue des Déchargeurs). Even though Francois de Villeroy was six years younger than Louis XIV, they were friends, probably because the young Louis XIV enjoyed the role of protector to a younger child.

An intimate of the king, a finished courtier, and leader of society and a man of great personal gallantry, Villeroy was marked out for advancement in the army, which he loved, but career soldiers had a more just appreciation of his abilities than Louis. In 1693, without having exercised any really-important or responsible command, he was made Marshal of France. In 1695, when François-Henri de Montmorency, duc de Luxembourg died, he obtained the command of the army in Flanders (see War of the Grand Alliance); William III found him a far easier opponent than the "little hunchback" (the duc de Luxembourg). Villeroy was responsible for the senseless bombardment of Brussels in 1695, which occasioned its reconstruction in the 18th century by giving it the regularity and unity of architecture seen today although it was again damaged in both World Wars.

In 1701, Villeroy was sent to Italy to supersede Nicolas Catinat and was soon beaten by the inferior army of Prince Eugene of Savoy at Chiari (see War of the Spanish Succession). In February 1702 he was made prisoner at the surprise of the Battle of Cremona.

In the following years he was pitted against the Duke of Marlborough in the Low Countries. Marlborough's own difficulties with the Dutch and other allied commissioners, rather than Villeroy's own skill, put off the inevitable disaster for some years, but in 1706 Marlborough attacked him and thoroughly defeated him at the Battle of Ramillies. Louis consoled his old friend with this remark: "At our age, one is no longer lucky". However, Louis superseded Villeroy in the command, and Villeroy lived the life of a courtier and, although suspected of being involved in plots, maintained his friendship with Louis. During this time, his secretary was Pierre-François Godard de Beauchamps.

Under the Régence Villeroy was governor of the child King Louis XV and held several other high posts between 1717 and 1722, when he fell in disgrace for plotting against Philippe d'Orléans, Duke of Orléans, Regent of France (regent for Louis XV) and was sent to be governor of Lyon, virtually in exile. His family suffered a further disgrace when two younger members, the duc de Retz and the marquis d'Alincourt were exiled for having homosexual relations in the gardens at Versailles.  Louis XV recalled Villeroy into high office when he came of age.

Villeroy died in Paris in 1730.

Marriage and children 

He married on March 28, 1662  with Marguerite Marie de Cossé (1648–1708), and had 7 children: 
 Louis Nicolas de Neufville (1663–1734), Duke of Villeroy, who married Marguerite Le Tellier, daughter of the Marquis of Louvois;
 Camille de Neufville de Villeroy ;
 François Paul de Neufville (1677–1731), Archbishop of Lyon (1714) ;
 François Catherine de Neufville (died 1700) ;
 Madeleine Thérèse de Neufville (1666–1723), a nun ;
 Françoise Madeleine de Neufville, married João de Sousa, 3rd Marquis of Minas ;
 Catherine Anne de Neufville  (1674–1715), a nun ;

References

1644 births
1730 deaths
Military personnel from Lyon
Francois de Neufville
Marshals of France
French military personnel of the Nine Years' War
French army commanders in the War of the Spanish Succession
People of the Regency of Philippe d'Orléans
People of the Ancien Régime
Governors of the Children of France